Girl Overboard may refer to:

 Girl Overboard (band), an Australian pop music group, active from 1985-1993
 Girl Overboard (1929 film), a lost film
 Girl Overboard (1937 film), an American mystery film